Marino Zorzi (c. 1231 – 3 July 1312), born in Venice, was the 50th Doge of the Republic of Venice, from 23 August 1311 until his renunciation in 1312 and withdrawal to a hermitic life. He was married to Agneta (or Agnese, supposed to be surnamed Querini).  Considered to have been a devout man, he had served as an ambassador to Rome. He may have been elected to decrease tensions in the city caused by the attempted revolt of Bajamonte Tiepolo as well as tensions with Rome, still angry with Venice over her occupation of the city of Ferrara (1308–09).

Zorzi had not been the first choice as Doge; Stefano Giustinian had been chosen first, but Giustinian had refused the honor.  The elderly Zorzi did not succeed in re-establishing good relations with the Papacy and his short reign was characterized by several natural calamities.  His reign lasted only eleven months, and Zorzi, considered a saint in his lifetime, died in 1312.  His garments were sought after as holy relics.

His dogaressa, Agnese, is known to have intervened to have the silk-masters of Lucca train apprentices and supervise the production of silk fabrics in the workshops of the Venetian fraglia.

References

Bibliography
 Lattanzio Bianco, "Discorso del dottor Lattanzio Bianco Napol. academico destillatore detto l'Acuto. Intorno al Teatro della nobiltà d'Italia, del dott. Flaminio De Rossi, oue particolarmente dell'origini, e nobiltà di Napoli, di Roma, e di Vinezia si ragiona", publisher Isidoro Facij & Bartolomeo Gobetti, year: 1607
 Francesco Zazzera, "Della nobilta dell'Italia parte prima", publisher Gio. Battista Gargano, & Lucretio Nucci, year: 1615

1231 births
1312 deaths
13th-century Venetian people
14th-century Doges of Venice
Ambassadors of the Republic of Venice to the Holy See
Medieval Italian diplomats
13th-century diplomats